Budd Peak may refer to:
 Budd Peak (Enderby Land)
 Budd Peak (Heard Island)